Semoga Bahagia is a Malay song composed by the Singaporean composer Zubir Said, who also composed Majulah Singapura, the national anthem of Singapore. The song has been the official Children's Day song in Singapore since 1961.

History
Semoga Bahagia was composed by Zubir Said and targeted at students. It was first published and performed on 7 July 1957 at the Victoria Memorial Hall, and was eventually broadcast in Singapore and Kuala Lumpur as well. On 23 September 1961, the song was chosen by the Ministry of Education to commemorate Children's Day. All schools subsequently received a copy of the song and music teachers were sent to Beatty Secondary School for rehearsals. The song was sung by students on 23 October 1961, the first commemoration of Children's Day in Singapore.

In 1974, Zubir was informed by one of his former students that the lyrics to Semoga Bahagia had been altered. Feeling that it should not have been edited without his consent, Zubir wrote an open letter to the New Nation newspaper on 25 August protesting the change, likening the act to "damaging the prestige of the original painter". He also noted that two melodic phrases had been changed and deleted, and the refrain (chorus) entirely removed. His name had also been left out of the credits in the new songsheet and replaced with someone else's name. In an interview with Berita Harian, Zubir called for a law that would prevent such an act in future, noting that there was no copyright for music and songs.

When contacted by New Nation, Charles Lazaroo from the Extra-curricular Activities Centre replied that teachers had provided feedback that non-Malay students were having trouble singing the song due to its "intricate melody", and had requested for the song be simplified. Lazaroo also stated that they had had difficulty contacting Zubir, believing he was ill. According to Zubir's daughter Rohana, the composer refused to accept the explanation as the song had been sung for many years by that point. A mediator assisted in reaching a compromise in which a repetitive verse was removed with Zubir's approval and the original lyrics reinstated, in time for the song to be taught to students that October.

Semoga Bahagia is still sung annually on Children's Day in Singapore. It became the official theme song for the Singapore Youth Festival (SYF) and is also performed annually during the SYF.

Symbolism
The Malay title Semoga Bahagia has been variously translated as "Let Glory be Yours", "Glory belongs to you", and "May You Achieve Happiness". In the open letter published in 1974, Zubir wrote that some of the lyrics were intended to urge children to be progressive, healthy, knowledgeable, patriotic and respectful, amongst other similar themes.

Malay lyrics 
Semoga Bahagia

Sama-sama maju ke hadapan
Pandai cari pelajaran 
Jaga diri dalam kesihatan
Serta sopan santun dengan kawan-kawan

Dengan hati bersih serta suci
Sama-sama hormat dan berbudi
Jaga tingkah pemuda-pemudi
Adat dan budaya junjung tinggi

Capailah lekas cita-cita pemudi-pemuda
Supaya kita ada harga di mata dunia

Kalau kita lengah serta lupa
Hidup kita sia-sia
Jiwa besar sihat serta segar
Rajin dengan sabar tentu bahagia

Lemah lembut perangai pemudi
Cergas tangkas wataknya pemuda
Sukarela selalu berbakti
Sikap yang pembela dan berjasa

Capailah nama yang mulia pemudi-pemuda
Rajinlah supaya berjaya… 
Semoga Bahagia

Notes

References

External links
 - published by the Government of Singapore

Singaporean songs